2nd Duke of Newcastle may refer to:

 Henry Cavendish, 2nd Duke of Newcastle (1630–1691), English politician 
 Henry Pelham-Clinton, 2nd Duke of Newcastle (1720–1794), British nobleman